The following is a timeline of the history of the city of Long Beach, California, USA.

Prior to 20th century

 1888 – Willmore City renamed "Long Beach."
 1895 – Long Beach Public Library founded.

20th century
 1902 – The Pike amusement area begins operating.
 1908 – Office of mayor established.
 1911 – Port of Long Beach dedicated.
 1921 – Long Beach Oil Field discovered at Signal Hill.
 1923 – Daugherty Field (airfield) established.
 1924
 City Gas Department established.
 Argus newspaper in publication.
 City of Signal Hill incorporated in vicinity of Long Beach.
 1925 – Brayton Theatre opens.
 1929 – Long Beach Public Library's Alamitos branch built.
 1930 – Population: 142,032.
 1932 – Municipal Auditorium opens.
 1933 – March 10: The 6.4  Long Beach earthquake affects the Greater Los Angeles Area with a maximum Mercalli intensity of VIII (Severe), leaving 115–120 people dead, and causing an estimated $40 million in damage.
 1934 – Long Beach Main Post Office built.
 1940 – Population: 164,271.
 1943 – US Naval Dry Docks established on Terminal Island.
 1945 – Press-Telegram newspaper in publication.
 1947 – November 2: Spruce Goose aircraft takes flight.
 1949 – Los Angeles-Orange County State College opens.
 1950
 Long Beach Museum of Art founded.
 Population: 250,767.
 1951 – Circle Drive-In cinema in business.
 1952 – Miss USA and Miss Universe beauty pageants held in city.
 1954 – Long Beach State 49ers baseball team formed.
 1962 – Historical Society of Long Beach founded.
 1972 – California State University, Long Beach active.
 1975 – Grand Prix of Long Beach begins.
 1977 – Long Beach Public Library's main branch rebuilt.
 1978 – Chua Phat To (Buddhist center) founded.
 1981 – Earl Burns Miller Japanese Garden dedicated.
 1984 – Ernie Kell becomes mayor.
 1986 – Long Beach Heritage nonprofit founded.
 1990 – Population: 429,433.
 1994
 Beverly O'Neill becomes mayor.
 Gray Panthers of Greater Los Angeles headquartered in city.
 1996 – City website online (approximate date).
 1998 
 Greater Long Beach Interfaith Community Organization established.
 Aquarium of the Pacific opens
 1999 – Long Beach Towne Center (shopping area) opens.

21st century
 2000 – Population: 461,522.
 2001 – Society for the Prevention of Cruelty to Animals Los Angeles (spcaLA) and the City of Long Beach open the spcaLA P.D. Pitchford Companion Animal Village & Education Center, the first public-private partnership for animal welfare in the United States.
 2006 – Bob Foster becomes mayor.
 2010 – Population: 462,257; metro 12,828,837.
 2013
 Harvey Milk Park opens.
 Alan Lowenthal becomes U.S. representative for California's 47th congressional district.
 2014 – Robert Garcia becomes mayor.
 2022
 Waterfront offices could make way for housing, which was sold by ValueRock Realty and Holland Partner Group's move is also known poised to be redeveloped with lifestyle housing and style.
 The Shoreline Gateway development in this city is complete, which represents the growth of Long Beach city, both past and present. The tallest tower in Long Beach features 315 luxury apartments on building's upper floors, with about 6,500 square feet of commercial space and a five-level, and even 470-car subterranean parking garage below. Companies including Studio One Eleven, Carrier Johnson + Culture, and Relm have worked on main designment and construction on this project. Back times in 2004, this project was first proposed under, which was the now defunct Long Beach Community.

See also
 Long Beach, California history
 List of mayors of Long Beach, California
 List of City of Long Beach historic landmarks
 National Register of Historic Places listings in Los Angeles County, California
 Timelines of other cities in the Southern California area of California: Anaheim, Bakersfield, Los Angeles, Riverside, San Bernardino, San Diego, Santa Ana

References

Bibliography

 
 Walter Case. History of Long Beach and Vicinity. Chicago: S.J. Clarke Publishing Company, 1927.
 
 
 Fortune's Harbor. Larry Meyer and Pat Kalayjian, 1983
 The Golden Shore. Richard DeAtley, 1988
 The City and its People. Bill Hillburg, 2000.

External links

 
 Items related to Long Beach, various dates (via Digital Public Library of America)
  2013–

 
long beach